This is a list of roads designated A104. Roads entries are sorted in the countries alphabetical order.

 A104 road (England), the road from Islington Green to Epping in London, England
 A104 road (Kenya), the road from Nairobi, Kenya to the Tanzanian border at Namanga on the route to Arusha and Dar es Salaam
 A104 motorway (France), part of the Francilienne, a road around Paris

See also
 List of highways numbered 104

References